Lin Mei-chun (born 11 January 1974) is a Taiwanese footballer who played as a forward for the Chinese Taipei women's national football team. She was part of the team at the 1991 FIFA Women's World Cup. On club level she played for Ming Chuan University in Taiwan.

References

External links
 

1974 births
Living people
Taiwanese women's footballers
Chinese Taipei women's international footballers
Place of birth missing (living people)
1991 FIFA Women's World Cup players
Women's association football forwards
Asian Games medalists in football
Asian Games bronze medalists for Chinese Taipei
Footballers at the 1994 Asian Games
Medalists at the 1994 Asian Games